Barbara Galpin (Johnson; February 6, 1855 – August 14, 1922) was an American journalist. For twenty-five years Mrs. Galpin was identified with the Somerville Journal, serving as compositor, proof reader, cashier, editor woman's page and assistant manager. Galpin traveled extensively in the United States and Europe, writing books and articles of travel, and lectured much upon this subject. She was the author of several books and contributed to magazines, both prose and poems. She took a vital interest in hospital, charitable, and educational work, and when the Massachusetts Legislature provided for a “planning board” in every city of more than 10,000 people, the mayor of the city named her, with six men, on the Somerville board—the first woman in the state to occupy such a position. Galpin was a member of the New England Press Association, Authors' Guild of New York, League of American Pen Women (Washington, D.C.); Boston Authors' Club. Professional Woman's Club, and various local organizations. Galpin died in 1922.

Early years and education
Nellie Barbara Johnson was born in Weathersfield, Vermont, February 6, 1855, or 1856. She was the daughter of Henry Clay Johnson. Her mother's maiden name was Helen Frances Jones. From four years of age she lived in Claremont, New Hampshire, where she was educated at the public schools and Stevens High School, and under private teachers.

Career
At Somerville, on August 25, 1873, at the age of sixteen, she married Henry Wallace Galpin (1819–1875),
 a well-to-do gentleman, many years her senior. One son, George Henry Galpin (b. September 9, 1874), was born to them. On May 31, 1875, when she was only eighteen, her husband died. Complications in business matters wrecked the estate, and left her dependent upon her own endeavors.

She found a job at the compositor's case of the Somerville paper, where she soon became an expert. Incidentally she held copy, and at her own suggestion, began to edit manuscript, through which editing she first attracted attention. She soon became a proof-reader, and gave the paper its distinction for typographical as well as literary excellence. From this, she moved to editorial management, which she combined with promotion of circulation, where her business ability first showed itself. When the proprietor became the treasurer of Middlesex County, Galpin assumed the management of the business details, while retaining oversight of the circulation schemes and all literary and special features of the paper.

The "Woman's Page", which she conducted, and which was one of the leading features of the paper, was on as high a level as the work in any of the popular literary weeklies, and would of itself give her distinction in journalism. Her many series of articles on travel, both in the United States and in Europe, were among the most readable and instructive of their kind in magazine literature. One of the most complete of her series was issued in book form, under the caption In Foreign Lands. Her historical articles attracted even more attention, and one of these was published by the Somerville Historical Society as its first official issue. As a writer of verse and songs, Galpin won high praise. She was equally fortunate in public speaking. Her prominence in various lines of activity led to invitations to make addresses before women's clubs, historical societies, and various other associations. Her platform work was as carefully prepared as the work from her pen, and her reputation as a speaker was equal to that in literary effort. Her most important addresses in point of honor were before the Suburban Press Association of New England and the Woman's Congress at the World's Columbian Exposition in 1893.

Galpin gave her son a liberal and professional education. She had a home on Spring Hill. It was an article from her pen that led to the first meeting of the Heptorean Club of Somerville, of which she was one of the organizers. She became a charter member, served as treasurer as well as on the Board of Directors, and had much influence in making this one of the leading women's clubs of the country. Galpin was also a charter member of the New England Woman's Press Club, of which she was treasurer for several years.

At the completion of twenty-five years in journalism in one office and under one management, in the fall of 1903, the citizens of Somerville gave Galpin a reception and dinner at the Vendome in Boston, as a testimonial of their appreciation of her efforts in all lines of work in the city. She was a leader in many philanthropic and progressive civic movements. She won distinction as a writer and as a speaker, in society and in philanthropy, though her energies were largely devoted to the literary and office direction of a prosperous weekly journal.

Galpin died August 14, 1922 in New Haven, Connecticut.

Selected works
 In Foreign Lands, 1892
 History of Somerville journalism, 1901
 A helpful thought for every day, 1917

References

Attribution

Bibliography

External links
 

1855 births
1922 deaths
19th-century American journalists
20th-century American journalists
19th-century American women writers
20th-century American women writers
Journalists from Vermont
People from Weathersfield, Vermont
American women journalists